Chafé is a civil parish in the municipality of Viana do Castelo, Portugal. The population in 2011 was 2,841, in an area of 7.85 km2. It is located near the Atlantic coast, 7 km south of Viana do Castelo, Portugal, 59 km north of Porto.

References

Freguesias of Viana do Castelo